Viktor Gísli Hallgrímsson (born 24 July 2000) is an Icelandic handball player for HBC Nantes and the Icelandic national team.

He represented Iceland at the 2020 European Men's Handball Championship, and in the 2021 World Men's Handball Championship.

Individual awards
All-Star goalkeeper of the European Championship: 2022

References

External links

2000 births
Living people
Viktor Gísli Hallgrímsson
Sportspeople from Reykjavík
Expatriate handball players
Icelandic expatriate sportspeople in Denmark
Icelandic expatriate sportspeople in France